Michael Dunstan (born 12 March 1971) is a former Australian rules footballer who played with Fitzroy and the West Coast Eagles in the Australian Football League (AFL).

Dunstan started out at South Fremantle in 1991 and it was from there that he was drafted to Fitzroy, with the 40th selection of the 1992 AFL draft.

On his first AFL debut, against Carlton, Dunstan kicked goals with his first two kicks. He finished the season with 20 games and 20 goals and the half forward added another 18 games in 1994.

The rest of his career was ruined by injury and he managed just five appearances after joining the West Coast Eagles. He continued playing for South Fremantle but injuries forced him into retirement in 1998.

References

External links
 
 

1971 births
Australian rules footballers from Western Australia
Fitzroy Football Club players
West Coast Eagles players
South Fremantle Football Club players
Living people